Sowghanlu (also Romanized as Sowghānlū and Sooghanloo; also known as Sagālū, Sogānlū, and Soghānlū) is a village in Piran Rural District, in the Central District of Piranshahr County, West Azerbaijan Province, Iran. At the 2006 census, its population was 598, in 89 families.

References 

Populated places in Piranshahr County